10-Hydroxydecanic acid is a specialized saturated fatty acid that is a minor constituent of royal jelly. It was scientifically discovered in 1957.

See also
 Myrmicacin (3-hydroxydecanoic acid)
 Queen bee acid (10-hydroxydecenoic acid)

References

Fatty acids
Hydroxy acids
Bee products